Peace is a 2022 Indian Malayalam-language black comedy film directed by  Sanfeer K. The film stars Joju George, Asha Sharath, Mamukkoya and Remya Nambeesan in important roles. “The film tracks the chain of unprecedented events following an hyperlink narrative,” said the director. The Malayalam language version was released on 26 August, while Tamil, Telugu, Kannada and Hindi language versions are awaiting its release.

Summary
Peace revolves around a string of events happening in Carlos's life.

Cast 
Joju George as Carlos
Asha Sharath as Jalaja
Siddhique as Kajaji
Remya Nambeesan as Dr.Angel
Aditi Ravi as Renuka
Shalu Rahim as Gibran
Vijilesh Karayad as Jomon
Mamukkoya as Sukumaran
Anil Nedumangad as Dixon
Kottayam Pradeep as Pathrose
Arjun Singh as Melvin
Unni Nair as Veerankutty

Production 
The principal photography of the film began on 15 November 2020. Sanfeer K, a scientist, launched himself as the director with 'Peace', following a narrative structure similar films like Super Deluxe, Andhadhun and Ludo. The production team of 'Script Doctor Pictures', signed actors Joju George, Asha Sharath, Siddhique, Aditi Ravi, Anil Nedumangad and Mamukkoya for major roles. The major locations of the film are Ernakulam and Thodupuzha, where actor Anil Nedumangad drowned while bathing near the Malankara Dam site. The actor had gone to bath with friends during a break when the mishap occurred on Christmas Day. Actress Asha Sharath plays a self made entrepreneur, who runs a local restaurant and works as an Auto rickshaw driver in the film  and the character teaser revealed her name as Jalaja.Remya Nambeesan was signed to play Dr.Angel, a character with grey shades. Actors Mohanlal, Rakshith Shetty, Vijay Sethupathi and Bharat launched the film's official title poster through their social media pages. Singer Shahabaz Aman recorded a satirical song, written by Sanfeer K and composed by Jubair Muhammed. The trailer of the film was released on 4 August 2022, with The Times of India saying that, "the movie promises to offer thrills and chills".

Soundtrack 
The songs were tuned by Jubair Muhammed for the lyrics written by Sanfeer K and Dinu Mohan. 'Kallatharam..' song has Sanfeer K also, as composer. Shahabaz Aman and Joju George are among the playback singers of the film.

Release 
The had a theatrical release on 26 August 2022. The film was released through the SunNXT OTT platform on 5 October 2022.

Critical Response
Princy Alexander of Onmanorama mentioned that "The film scores well in the climax, and the movie ends with a promise of a second part". Aparna Prasanthi of Malayalam Indian Express appreciated the movie as a "Non-linear experimental film", but also stated that it's not everyone's cup of tea. Tony of ManoramaOnline stated that the film is an enjoyable black humour fun ride and appreciated the director for showing maturity in his debut film itself. A reviewer of Asianet News called the movie as a thrilling and enjoyable film, appreciating the entire cast, the twist in climax and the debutant director.

References

External links
 

2022 films
Films shot in Kochi
Hyperlink films
2022 directorial debut films
2022 thriller films
Indian thriller films
2020s Malayalam-language films